Guignardia is a genus of fungi in the family Botryosphaeriaceae.

The genus name of Guignardia is in honour of Jean Louis Léon Guignard (1852–1928), who was a French pharmacist and botanist.

The genus was circumscribed by Pierre Viala and Louis Etienne Ravaz in Bull. Soc. Mycol. France vol.8, issue 63 on page 177 in 1892.

Species

Guignardia abeana
Guignardia abietella-sibirica
Guignardia acaciae
Guignardia adeana
Guignardia adianti
Guignardia adriatica
Guignardia aegyptiaca
Guignardia aesculi
Guignardia agerati
Guignardia ahlesiana
Guignardia ailanthi
Guignardia aleuritis
Guignardia alhagi
Guignardia allamandae
Guignardia alliacea
Guignardia alnigena
Guignardia alternantherae
Guignardia alyxiae
Guignardia amomi
Guignardia anthurii
Guignardia aphyllanthis
Guignardia apiahyna
Guignardia apocyni
Guignardia arachidis
Guignardia araliae
Guignardia araucariae
Guignardia ardisiae
Guignardia arengae
Guignardia asparagi
Guignardia astragali
Guignardia atropurpurea
Guignardia aurangabadensis
Guignardia bambusae
Guignardia bambusella
Guignardia bambusina
Guignardia betulae
Guignardia bidwellii
Guignardia biennis
Guignardia boltoniae
Guignardia bulgarica
Guignardia bumeliae
Guignardia buxicola
Guignardia cabelludae
Guignardia cahirensis
Guignardia calami
Guignardia cambucae
Guignardia camelliae
Guignardia canavaliae
Guignardia candeloflamma
Guignardia capsici
Guignardia caricae
Guignardia caricicola
Guignardia caricis
Guignardia caryophyllea
Guignardia castanopsidis
Guignardia cephalanthae
Guignardia cephalotaxi-nanae
Guignardia chandrapurensis
Guignardia chondri
Guignardia cinchonae
Guignardia cirsii
Guignardia citricarpa
Guignardia clematidis
Guignardia clusiae
Guignardia cocoës
Guignardia cocogena
Guignardia cocoicola
Guignardia codiaei
Guignardia coffeae
Guignardia concinna
Guignardia convolvuli
Guignardia coronillae
Guignardia creberrima
Guignardia crepidis
Guignardia cryptomeriae
Guignardia cussoniae
Guignardia cyperi
Guignardia depressa
Guignardia diapensiae
Guignardia dieffenbachiae
Guignardia diffusa
Guignardia dinochloae
Guignardia dioscoreae
Guignardia discophora
Guignardia dodartiae
Guignardia dracaenae
Guignardia durmitorensis
Guignardia dyerae
Guignardia echinophila
Guignardia effusa
Guignardia epilobii
Guignardia eucalyptorum
Guignardia eucrypta
Guignardia eugeniae
Guignardia eupatorii
Guignardia euphorbiae
Guignardia euphorbiae-spinosae
Guignardia excentrica
Guignardia fatsiae
Guignardia festiva
Guignardia fici
Guignardia fici-beecheyanae
Guignardia fici-septicae
Guignardia flacourtiae
Guignardia foeniculata
Guignardia franconica
Guignardia freycinetiae
Guignardia fulvida
Guignardia fuscocinerea
Guignardia fuscocoriacea
Guignardia galactina
Guignardia garciniae
Guignardia gaultheriae
Guignardia glycyrrhizae
Guignardia gmelinae
Guignardia graminea
Guignardia graminicola
Guignardia graminis
Guignardia harunganae
Guignardia haydenii
Guignardia heliconiae
Guignardia helicteres
Guignardia herbarum
Guignardia hernandiae
Guignardia heterostemmae
Guignardia heterostemmatis
Guignardia heterotrichi
Guignardia heveae
Guignardia heveicola
Guignardia hibisci-sabdariffae
Guignardia himalayensis
Guignardia hispanica
Guignardia horaninoviae
Guignardia humulina
Guignardia ilicis-formosanae
Guignardia istriaca
Guignardia jasmini
Guignardia jasminicola
Guignardia juniperina
Guignardia jussiaeae
Guignardia justiciae
Guignardia kareliniae
Guignardia lapponica
Guignardia laricina
Guignardia latemarensis
Guignardia linderae
Guignardia lingue
Guignardia lini
Guignardia lonchocarpi
Guignardia lonicerae
Guignardia lunulata
Guignardia lysimachiae
Guignardia magnoliae
Guignardia mammeae
Guignardia mangiferae
Guignardia manihoticola
Guignardia manihotis
Guignardia manokwaria
Guignardia medinillae
Guignardia melanostigma
Guignardia mespili
Guignardia miconiae
Guignardia microscopica
Guignardia microsticta
Guignardia migrans
Guignardia mildae
Guignardia mirabilis
Guignardia miribelii
Guignardia moelleriana
Guignardia musae
Guignardia myopori
Guignardia nectandrae
Guignardia niesslii
Guignardia nilagiriaca
Guignardia oleandrina
Guignardia opuntiae
Guignardia oxyriae
Guignardia paulowniae
Guignardia pedrosensis
Guignardia pegani
Guignardia perpusilla
Guignardia perseae
Guignardia philoprina
Guignardia photiniae
Guignardia phytolaccae
Guignardia pinastri
Guignardia pipericola
Guignardia piperis
Guignardia plectroniae
Guignardia pleurothallis
Guignardia podocarpi
Guignardia polygonati
Guignardia polygoni
Guignardia polygoni-chinensis
Guignardia populi
Guignardia poterii
Guignardia prasiolae
Guignardia prominens
Guignardia pruni-persicae
Guignardia psidii
Guignardia puerariae
Guignardia puiggarii
Guignardia pullulans
Guignardia punctiformis
Guignardia punctoidea
Guignardia quercus-ilicis
Guignardia ramulicola
Guignardia rathenowiana
Guignardia reniformis
Guignardia reticulata
Guignardia rhamni
Guignardia rhodomyrti
Guignardia rhynchosporae
Guignardia robiniae
Guignardia rosae
Guignardia rosaecola
Guignardia rosicola
Guignardia rubi
Guignardia rugosa
Guignardia ryukyuensis
Guignardia salicina
Guignardia sansevieriae
Guignardia sarcomphali
Guignardia sawadae
Guignardia scabiosae
Guignardia scirpicola
Guignardia seriata
Guignardia serratulae
Guignardia sibirica
Guignardia singularis
Guignardia smilacicola
Guignardia smilacinae
Guignardia smilacis
Guignardia sojae
Guignardia sophorae
Guignardia spinicola
Guignardia steppani
Guignardia sterculiae
Guignardia stromatica
Guignardia sudetica
Guignardia sydowiana
Guignardia synedrellae
Guignardia tetrazygiae
Guignardia theae
Guignardia tilakii
Guignardia tofieldiae
Guignardia traversoana
Guignardia trichosanthis
Guignardia tunetana
Guignardia ulmariae
Guignardia umbelliferarum
Guignardia vaccinii
Guignardia valesiaca
Guignardia veronicae
Guignardia verrucicola
Guignardia xanthosomatis
Guignardia xylostei

References

External links
Index Fungorum

Botryosphaeriaceae
Dothideomycetes genera